Sudhakar Krishnamurti (born July 22, 1957 in Tamil Nadu, South India), is a medical doctor, clinical andrologist, microsurgeon, and sexual medicine expert. He is director of the Andromeda Andrology Center, Hyderabad, India.

Biography
Krishnamurti was the first Indian doctor to exclusively practice clinical andrology, the branch of medicine that deals with disorders of the male reproductive system.

Krishnamurti's medical education began at the T.N. Medical College and B.Y.L. Nair Hospital, Bombay. During his academic career, he was awarded many gold medals, scholarships and prizes. After completing his M.S. in general surgery and serving as lecturer at the University of Bombay. Krishnamurti obtained his andrological knowledge in the United States of America, Belgium, the UK, Germany and the Netherlands.

Krishnamurti is credited with many pioneering endeavors in the areas of investigative and operative andrology - penile duplex doppler evaluation, Rigiscan monitoring, phalloarteriography, microsurgical varicocelectomy, and microsurgical revascularization (bypass) operation for impotence (erectile dysfunction). In recognition of these, the Urological Society of India has conferred on him the 'Innovations in Urology' and 'State-of-the-Art Lecture' awards.

Krishnamurti is an active member of several academic associations and has presented and published several papers at national and international fora. He has been invited to lecture and / or operate in Germany, Italy, Malaysia, Turkey, Nepal, Muscat, China, France, Egypt, Taiwan, the Philippines, the Czech Republic, Japan, Indonesia, Thailand, Argentina, Australia, and Korea.

Krishnamurti is the only Asian to have received the prestigious Herbert Newman Award for original clinical research in the field of impotence. He was awarded this at the 6th World Impotence Meeting on Impotence, Singapore, 1994, for having described a new penile dermal flap operation for Peyronie's disease - a disease which can cause impotence.

Appointments
Krishnamurti has been twice appointed to international sexual medicine consultations committees. He was a committee member at both the 1st and 2nd International Consultation(s) on Erectile Dysfunction, which were held in Paris in 1999 and 2003 respectively. He has co-authored, in two consecutive editions, the committees' handbooks' chapters on 'Surgical Treatment and Mechanical Devices'.

His other appointments include:
 Editorial board member: Journal of Sexual Medicine
 Editorial board member (former): International Journal of Impotence Research
 Editorial board member (former): Asian Journal of Andrology
 Editorial board member: World Journal of Urology
 Editorial board member: Fertility Today
 Invited reviewer: Indian Journal of Urology 
 Executive committee member: Asia Pacific Society for Sexual Medicine
 Chairman (former): Audits Committee, APSSM
 Visiting fellow: University of Nanjing, China
 Honorary fellow: Council of Sex Education and Parenthood International
 Advisory committee member: International Society for the Study of the Aging Male
 Advisory committee member: Asia Pacific Society for the Study of the Aging Male
 Board member: Asian Erectile Dysfunction Advice, Counselling and Therapy Group 
 Convener (former): Andrology section of the Urological Society of India (USI)
 Founder: Andrology, Gender, Aging & Sexual sciences Society of India 
 Member: Awards and Prizes Committee - International Society for Sexual Medicine
 Member: Research & Scientific Committee, APSSM
 Member: Standards Committee, 
 Member (former): Publications Committee, ISSM
 Member: Advisory Committee, 10th Biennial Meeting of the Asia Pacific Society for Sexual Medicine (APSSM); Cairns, Australia: October 2005
 Organizing Chairman: APSSM-AGASSI Conference
 Member: Development committee, APSSM
 Member: World's first batch of doctors enrolled for the EASM's fellowship program in sexual medicine
 Member: National Advisory Committee on Assisted Reproductive Technology (ART) of the ICMR (Indian Council of Medical Research)

Writer
Krishnamurti is also a writer, columnist and men's health advisor and contributes regularly to medical textbooks, journals, newspapers, magazines and health portals, including his own award-winning website, www.andrology.com (nine awards since its creation). His contributions to andrology have also been recognised by many lay fora and he has been featured in the Limca Book of Records, Biography International, and many other newspapers, magazines, radio and television shows. His first book, Sex Is Not A Four Letter Word, an edutainment book written essentially for the lay reader and published by Rupa & Co. 2007: ,was released in January, 2007.

References

External links
Sudhakar Krishnamurti

Living people
Indian surgeons
1957 births
Medical doctors from Tamil Nadu